Serhiy Shevchuk (born 21 September 1990) is a professional Ukrainian football winger.

Honours
2009 UEFA European Under-19 Football Championship: Champion
2017 Latvian Football Cup: Winner

External links

1990 births
Living people
People from Teofipol
Ukrainian footballers
Association football midfielders
Ukraine youth international footballers
Ukrainian expatriate footballers
Expatriate footballers in Lithuania
Expatriate footballers in Belarus
Expatriate footballers in Latvia
Ukrainian expatriate sportspeople in Lithuania
Ukrainian expatriate sportspeople in Belarus
Latvian Higher League players
FC Dynamo Kyiv players
FC Dynamo-2 Kyiv players
FC Dynamo-3 Kyiv players
FC Volyn Lutsk players
FK Banga Gargždai players
FC Šiauliai players
FK Riteriai players
FC Vitebsk players
FK Liepāja players
FC Ahrobiznes Volochysk players
Sportspeople from Khmelnytskyi Oblast